Slate House may refer to:

Slate House (Macon, Georgia), listed on the National Register of Historic Places in Bibb County, Georgia
Slate House (Brownville, Maine), listed on the National Register of Historic Places in Piscataquis County, Maine
Slate House, County Antrim, a townland in County Antrim, Northern Ireland